Michenera is a genus of fungi in the family Corticiaceae. The genus contains four species found in pantropical regions.

The genus name of Michenera is in honour of Ezra Michener (1794-1887), who was an American teacher, botanist (Mycology and Lichenology).

References

External links

Corticiales
Agaricomycetes genera